Ralph "Toddy" Giannini (1917–1996), known to many as "Hot Toddy," was a member of the 1940 All-American basketball team representing Santa Clara University.  He and his other teammates were known as the "Magicians of the Maplewood".  In 1940 Giannini headed the All-American all star team to a 44–42 defeat of the Harlem Globetrotters before a crowd of 22,000 fans in Madison Square Garden. Ralph "Toddy" Giannini was also inducted into the San Francisco Prep Hall of fame as  well as Santa Clara University's Hall of Fame.

See also
1940 NCAA Men's Basketball All-Americans

References

1917 births
1996 deaths
All-American college men's basketball players
Amateur Athletic Union men's basketball players
Santa Clara Broncos men's basketball players
American men's basketball players